Anthony Hockman House, also known as the Hockman-Roller House, is a historic home located at Harrisonburg, Virginia. It was built in 1871, and is a two-story, three-bay, frame I-house Italianate dwelling.  It has a projecting central bay topped with a low gable and with the hipped-roof cupola.  The house features applied "gingerbread" trim, including molded corner pilasters, a heavily bracketed cornice, an elaborate one-story front porch, and heavily molded regency garret windows.

It was listed on the National Register of Historic Places in 1982.

References

Houses on the National Register of Historic Places in Virginia
Italianate architecture in Virginia
Houses completed in 1871
Houses in Harrisonburg, Virginia
National Register of Historic Places in Harrisonburg, Virginia